Chess Mates is a computer software program, released in 1996 for Macintosh and 1997 for Microsoft Windows, designed to teach the basics of Chess. Chess Mates was marketed as an easy way for children to learn the building blocks of becoming a successful chess player. It was developed by Stepping Stone (a division of Presage Software and Interplay) and published by Brainstorm. The original price was $34.95.

Reception 
Although relatively few copies were released, the game has received favorable reviews. Discovery School cited the game's appealing graphics, sense of humor, and effective teaching of the various aspects of Chess.

References

External links
Chess Mates at MobyGames
Chess Mates at DiscoverySchool
Chess Mates at gameDB

1996 video games
Video games developed in the United States
Windows games
Classic Mac OS games